Boston City Council elections were held on November 15, 1983, with preliminary elections on October 11, 1983. This election transitioned the Council from having 9 members (all at-large) to having 13 members (9 district representatives and 4 at-large). All 13 seats were contested in both the preliminary and general election.

Incumbents
Each of the nine incumbent at-large councillors ran for Boston public office.

At-large
In the preliminary election, ten names appeared on the ballot, with voters able to choose four; the top eight vote-getters then appeared on the ballot in the general election.

Voters in the general election could select four of the eight final candidates; Councillors McCormack, Iannella, Tierney, and O'Neil received the most votes, so were re-elected and filled the four at-large seats, while Councillor McDermott finished fifth and was not re-elected.

District 1
Robert Travaglini was elected.

District 2
James M. Kelly was elected.

District 3
James E. Byrne was elected.

District 4
Charles Yancey was elected.

District 5
Thomas Menino was elected.

District 6
At-large councillor Maura Hennigan was elected.

District 7
At-large councillor Bruce Bolling was elected.

District 8
David Scondras was elected, becoming the first openly gay Boston City Council member.

District 9
Brian J. McLaughlin was elected.

See also
 List of members of Boston City Council
 Boston mayoral election, 1983

References

Further reading

External links
 

City Council election
Boston City Council elections
Boston City Council election
Boston City Council